Karthik Palani is an Indian cinematographer who works in the Indian film industry.

Career 
Karthik Palani worked as an assistant to Tirru during Mercury (2018) and Petta (2019).<ref>{{Cite web|url=https://cinema.vikatan.com/tamil-cinema/cinematographer-karthik-palani-shares-his-penguin-movie-experience|title=கொடைக்கானல் காடு, மிட்நைட் ஷூட்... கீர்த்தி சுரேஷை சுற்றி விஷத் தேனீ!" - 'பெண்குயின்' அனுபவம்|language=ta|work=Vikatan|last=Rajan|first=Ayyanar|date=4 July 2020|access-date=21 July 2020|archive-date=21 July 2020|archive-url=https://web.archive.org/web/20200721222644/https://cinema.vikatan.com/tamil-cinema/cinematographer-karthik-palani-shares-his-penguin-movie-experience|url-status=live}}</ref> He also worked as an assistant cinematographer in several Hindi, Telugu, and Tamil-language films. He garnered acclaim for his work in Penguin (2020). A critic from The Times of India noted that "Karthik Phalani's visuals" help "set the eerie mood" whilst a critic from The Hindu stated how "The filmmaker, however, revelation in terms of his visual sense. Two shots come to mind that are beautifully imagined and shot". His next film was the Kannada film French Biriyani'' (2020). 
A critic noted that "Cinematographer Karthik Palani has created the right atmosphere and has employed quirky camera moves to keep us in tune with the film’s proceedings".

Filmography

References

External links 

Living people
Telugu film cinematographers
Hindi film cinematographers
Tamil film cinematographers
Kannada film cinematographers
Malayalam film cinematographers
21st-century Indian photographers
Cinematographers from Tamil Nadu
1985 births